Wielka Wola  is a village in the administrative district of Gmina Paradyż, within Opoczno County, Łódź Voivodeship, in central Poland.

References

Wielka Wola
Radom Governorate
Kielce Voivodeship (1919–1939)
Łódź Voivodeship (1919–1939)